The men's road race at the 1990 UCI Road World Championships took place on Sunday September 2, 1990, in Utsunomiya, Tochigi, Japan over a distance of .

145 riders started, 57 classified finishers,
winner's average speed: 38.01 km/hr

Final classification

References

External links
 the-sports.org

Men's Road Race
UCI Road World Championships – Men's road race

it:Campionato del mondo di ciclismo su strada 1990
nl:Wereldkampioenschap wielrennen 1990